Great Wall Movie Enterprises Limited was Hong Kong's leading left-wing studio and one committed to making progressive Mandarin films with social content as well as entertainment value.

Unusual for Hong Kong films, some of their films were publicly shown in Maoist-era China. For the same reason, their films were banned in Taiwan.

Overview
In 1948, Zhang Shankun co-founded with Yuan Yang'an the Great Wall Pictures Corporation. The momentum for developing a Mandarin film industry was established but Zhang and Yuan departed company when the finances and administration of Great Wall became influenced by events happening in China. Yuan stayed in the reorganised Great Wall Movie Enterprises Ltd, which became identified with left-wing tendencies.

Well known for their patriotism towards mainland China, Great Wall often collaborated with Feng Huang (Phoenix) Motion Picture Co and it was the pioneer studio in the early 1950s.

Notable directors and actors
There are many veterans and talents from China who joined the studio. Meanwhile, many acting talents and directors are cultivated, too.

Directors:
Li Pingqian
Cheng Bugao
Yuan Yang'an
Cheung Yam Yin
Huang Yu
Wong Su Chen
Hu Hsiao Fung
Wen Yi Min
Jin Yong
Actors:
 Fu Che (also known as  Fu Qi, also director and producer)
 Hsia Moon (also known as Xia Meng, Miranda Yang, also producer)
 Shi Hui (石慧, also known as Shek Hwei)
 Chen Sisi
 Jiang Han 
 Zhang Zheng
 Guan Shan
 Gao Yuan
 Li Tziang
 Wei Wei
 Paw Hee Jing 
 Bao Fong
 Zhu Hong
 Wang Baozhen
 Ping Fan
 Gong Qiuxia
 Feng Lin
 Fang Ping
 Yu Wanfei
 Qiu Ping
 Chen Juanjuan
 Liang Shan
 Lan Qing
 Zhang Bingqian
 Betty Loh Ti

Present
In 1982, Great Wall merged with Feng Huang, Chung Yuen and Sun Luen Film Co. as Sil-Metropole Organisation.

Cinema of Hong Kong

Film production companies of Hong Kong
1949 establishments in Hong Kong
1982 disestablishments in Hong Kong
1982 mergers and acquisitions